Andrew Turton (193813 August 2021) was a British anthropologist who specialised on Thailand and the Tai peoples of Southeast Asia.

Life
Turton held the Chair of Anthropology and Chair of the Centre of Southeast Asian Studies at the School of Oriental and African Studies (SOAS), University of London. He lived for many years in Thailand, where he did research, mainly in Northern Thailand, but also in Laos and the Chinese province of Yunnan, where the native areas of several Tai peoples lie. He lived in London until his death in 2021.

Notable works
 
 
  (Also published in the Journal of Contemporary Asia. 8 (1): 104–142. 1978. .)

References 

1938 births
2021 deaths
20th-century anthropologists
21st-century anthropologists
Academics of SOAS University of London
Alumni of SOAS University of London
British anthropologists
Scientists from Bristol
Thai studies scholars